Lake Dukan (or Lake Dokan) (Arabic:بحيرة دوكان)  is a lake in Kurdistan Region Iraq. It is located close to the city of Ranya, and is a reservoir on the Little Zab created by the construction of the Dukan Dam. The Dukan Dam was built between 1954 and 1959 as a multi-purpose dam to provide water storage, irrigation and hydroelectricity. Prior to the flooding of Lake Dukan, the area has been subjected to archaeological research to investigate as many archaeological sites as possible. An archaeological survey in the Ranya Plain documented some 40 archaeological sites with evidence for occupation ranging from the sixth millennium BCE up to the present. Five of these sites were then excavated: Tell Bazmusian, ed-Dem, Kamarian, Qarashina and Tell Shemshara. The excavations at Tell Bazmusian revealed a temple dating to the second millennium BCE. At Tell Shemshara, an early-sixth millennium BCE village was excavated, as well as an early-second millennium BCE palace with a small archive of clay tablets. The inhabitants of some 50 villages in the flooded area, around 1,000–1,200 families, were resettled to the west of the lake.

See also
List of reservoirs and dams in Iraq

References

External links
Lake Dukan Rowing Club

Sulaymaniyah Governorate
Dukan
Dukan
Tourist attractions in Iraqi Kurdistan